The Marriage Swindler is a 1938 German drama film directed by Herbert Selpin and starring Eduard von Winterstein, Viktoria von Ballasko and Kurt Waitzmann. It is sometimes known by the alternative title Die rote Mütze (The Red Cap). A confidence trickster is released from prison and travels to a village where he blackmails and tricks women out of their savings, before eventually being caught.

The film's sets were designed by the art directors Max Knaake and Karl Vollbrecht.

Cast
 Eduard von Winterstein as Franz Buschko
 Viktoria von Ballasko as Marianne, seine Tochter
 Kurt Waitzmann as Mathias Schröder
 Harald Paulsen as Häselich / Ullmann
 Hilde Körber as Melitta Dolechal
 Fita Benkhoff as Frau Lindemann
 Elisabeth Flickenschildt as Frau Buschko
 Alfred Maack as Paaschen, Bahnhofswirt
 Heinrich Kalnberg as Vater Zierlein
 Friedrich Ettel as Vorsteher Scharrelmann
 Ernst Behmer as Pauluschkat
 Gerhard Bienert as Assistant Obermeier
 Hans Hemes as 1. Beamter
 Helmut Heyne as Assistant Fiedler
 Eva Klein-Donath as Frau Becker
 Gerda Kuffner as Frau Niemeyer
 Waldemar Potier as Kellnerjunge Karl
 Arthur Reinhardt as 2. Beamter

Production
The film was directed by Selpin for the small studio A.B.C.-Film, and distributed by the major company Tobis Film. It is based on a novel by Gertrude Von Brockdorff. Its neorealism and pessimistic tone were a sharp change from Selpin's recent work which had been dominated by musicals, comedies and society dramas and was extremely rare in the Nazi era when German cinema strove to be light and entertaining. The film had trouble with the censors, and its release was delayed. It has been described as "One of the finest German sound films ever made".

References

Bibliography

External links

1938 films
German drama films
1930s German-language films
Films directed by Herbert Selpin
Films based on German novels
Films of Nazi Germany
Tobis Film films
German black-and-white films
Films with screenplays by Fritz Wendhausen
1938 drama films
1930s German films